Le Messager is a daily newspaper in Cameroon. It was founded in 1979 by Pius Njawé, who in 2009 said that he had been arrested 126 times in 30 years. Reporters without Borders called it "the country’s first campaigning newspaper."

References

External links
 Official Website

Newspapers published in Cameroon
Newspapers established in 1979
French-language newspapers published in Africa
1979 establishments in Cameroon